Contemporary Politics is a quarterly peer-reviewed academic journal in the discipline of political science, and is published by Taylor & Francis. According to the Journal Citation Reports, the journal has a 2019 impact factor of 1.421.

Abstracting and indexing 

Contemporary Politics is abstracted and indexed in:

 International Political Science Abstracts
 Sociological Abstracts

References

External links

Political science journals